Zhang Wenzhong (born July 1962) is a Chinese businessman and scholar, Stanford alumnus. Zhang is the founder of Wumart, Chairman of Dmall Technology, Rotating Chairman of the Internet of Things Committee of All-China Federation of Industry and Commerce, Lifetime Trustee of Nankai University, President of Nankai University's Alumni Entrepreneur Association, Honorary President of China General Chamber of Commerce. Zhang is also a visiting professor of Renmin University of China, Nankai University and University of Chinese Academy of Sciences.

Education 
He obtained his bachelor's degree of Science in Mathematics and Master of Economics from Nankai University; he was Doctor of Systems Science from Chinese Academy of Sciences and completed his postdoc at Stanford University's School of Engineering.

Business career

Founded Wumart, Digitalized Retail Chain 

Dr. Zhang is a pioneer of digitalization in Chinese retail industry and founded one of the largest omnichannel digitalized retailers in China, Wumart Group. He started China's first modern supermarket chain under the brand of Wumart(Wumei in Chinese) in Beijing in 1994. In 2003, Wumart became the first private retail business in China to be listed on the Hong Kong Stock Exchange (HKEX).

As of May 2022, Wumart operates more than 2,000 multi-format stores nation-wide with total annualized revenue of over 110 billion RMB (eq. US$16.5 billion) . Retail sales generated by mobile application users accounted for over 70% of Wumart's total retail sales in 2021. Wumart has been praised for its outstanding role in combating SARS outbreak in 2003 and recent COVID-19 outbreak.

Zhang is a successful consolidator of Chinese retail industry with extensive experience in post-M&A integration and synergies building. Notable deals include the acquisitions of B&Q China, Xinhua Department Store, Lotte Northern China, and several state-owned retail companies. In April 2020, Wumart successfully completed the deal of 2 billion euros to hold 80% stake in the Fortune 500 Germany-based METRO's China business. Wumart and METRO joined forces to create a new retail model in China, develop Business-to-Business operations, and put more emphasis on expanding supply chains, brick-and-mortar outlets and digitalization to improve efficiency.

Prior to founding Wumart, Zhang worked in the Development Research Center of the State Council of China in the late 80s and early 90s.

Founded Dmall, Omnichannel Digital Retail Solution Provider

Awards and Recognitions 
China's 50 Most Influential Business Leaders 2020 and 2022 by Fortune Magazine

China's Advanced Individuals in Private Sector in Addressing COVID-19 (2021)

China's 25 Most Influential Business Leaders of the Year 2019,2020,2021

China's Top 10 Figures in Private Enterprises of the Year 2020

China Chain Store & Franchise Association's People of the Year 2019

Outstanding Contribution to M&A in China of the Year 2019

China's Top 10 Economic Person of the Year 2018

Wrongful conviction in 2006, Overturned by the Supreme Court in 2018 
In 2006, Zhang was arrested based on unjust accusations. In 2008, the Hengshui Intermediate People's Court of Hebei province sentenced him to 18 years in prison on charges of misappropriation, bribery and fraud, and changed the verdict to 12 years for the final ruling in 2009. A total of RMB 52.1 million in fines was also ordered, which was a violation of personal and enterprise property rights.

While in prison, he refused to succumb to injustice and spent most of his time reading and researching. During that time he patented four of his own inventions, receiving one top prize and two first class scientific and technological progress awards at a provincial and ministerial level. He was granted early release.

On December 28, 2017, the Supreme People's Court announced a retrial for Zhang's case, followed by the work reports of the Supreme People's Court and Supreme People's Procuratorate delivered at the plenary session of 13th National People's Congress (NPC) in March 2018, that ruled his case as a wrongful conviction that is to be corrected to fully implement the property rights protection.

On May 31, 2018, his case was turned over by the Supreme Court of China. In its statement, the Supreme People's Court - after a final retrial - made the ruling that the original sentence was based on insufficient evidence and the laws applied were improper, quashing a guilty verdict for which he received an 18-year jail term ten years ago.

Timeline of Zhang's case
 Nov 12, 2006: Zhang Wenzhong investigated for graft by government authorities. Zhang later resigned from Wumei.
 Dec 25, 2007: Prosecutors in Hengshui, Hebei province, formally charged Zhang with fraud, embezzlement and bribery.
 Oct 9, 2008: The Hengshui Intermediate People's Court sentenced Zhang to 18 years in prison and impose a fine of 500,000 yuan ($78,038). Zhang appealed.
 March 30, 2009: The Hebei High People's Court made a final ruling on the appeal. Zhang sentenced to 12 years in prison for the three crimes, still with a fine of 500,000 yuan.
 Feb 6, 2013: Zhang was released from prison. Zhang twice received commutations.
 December 2015: The court in Hebei rejected Zhang's appeal.
 October 2016: Zhang appealed to the Supreme People's Court.
 Dec 27, 2017: The Supreme People's Court agreed to retry Zhang's case.
 Feb 12, 2018 The top court hears the case publicly.
 May 31: Zhang's is cleared about 10 years after being pronounced guilty by the first court

Address at the annual summit of China Entrepreneur Forum (CEF) 
On February 28, he addressed the annual summit of China Entrepreneur Forum with the title Time Tries Devotion, Hearts Warm the World.His address won popular support nationwide. Part of the address was quoted in the media. "Although justice arrives late, shall it never be absent. Belated justice is still extremely precious." "I do not regret for maintaining my integrity, not compromising with my dignity and not breaching my own morality baseline. " "Love shines in the world, Justice cherished in hearts, Kinship and friendship deep as ocean.""Spring blooms in heart, Life enlightens with sunshine".

References 

1962 births
Living people
Businesspeople from Heilongjiang
Chinese chief executives
Chinese company founders
Chinese scholars
Nankai University alumni
People from Daqing
Stanford University fellows